Al-Ras al-Ahmar was a Palestinian Arab village in the Safad Subdistrict. It was depopulated during the 1948 Arab–Israeli War on October 30, 1948, by the Israeli 7th Armored Brigade during Operation Hiram. It was located 8.5 km north of Safad.

History
Remains found in the village indicate that it was populated  during the  Byzantine era.

Ottoman era
Incorporated into the Ottoman Empire in 1517 with the rest of Palestine,  in 1596 it appeared under the name of  Ras al-Ahmar in the tax registers as part of the nahiya (subdistrict) of Jira  in the Safad Sanjak. It had  an all Muslim population, consisting of 54 households and 22  bachelors; an estimated 418 persons. They paid taxes on agricultural products, including wheat, barley, vineyards, "kirsanna", goats and beehives, in addition to occasional revenues and an olive oil or grape syrup press; the taxes totalled 5,500 akçe. Half of the revenues went to a Waqf.

In 1838 er-Ras al-Ahmar was noted as a village located in the Safad district.

Algerian followers of Abdelkader El Djezairi have been defeated by the French in Algeria, and sought refuge in another part of the Ottoman Empire. They were settled in various locations in Ottoman Syria, including Al-Ras al-Ahmar.

In 1875 Victor Guérin found that the village was situated 844 meters above sea level, and contained 150 Muslims.

In 1881  the PEF's Survey of Western Palestine described the village "Well-built stone houses. containing 350  Algerian Moslems, situated on high hill, with gardens down the slopes. There is a perennial supply of good water in Wâdy Râs el Ahmar."

A population list from about 1887 showed  Ras el Ahmar to have  about 690 Muslim  inhabitants.

British Mandate era
In the 1922 census of Palestine conducted by the British Mandate authorities,  Al-Ras al-Ahmar  had a population of 405; all Muslims,  increasing slightly in the 1931 census to 447; 6 Christians and 441  Muslims,  in  a total of 92 houses.

In the  1945 statistics, al-Ras al-Ahmar had a population of 620, all Muslims, and a land area of 7,934 dunams.  Of this, 1,008 dunams were plantations and irrigable land, 4,728 were used for cereals, while 61 dunams were classified as built-up, or urban area.
An elementary school for boys was founded during this period.

1948, aftermath
Ras al-Ahmar was on the border  between the territories  allotted to the Arab and to the Jewish state  under the 1947 UN Partition Plan.

In March 1948, a British medical officer reported that the village of  Al-Ras al-Ahmar was completely unprepared for war.

The fall of Safad  and the expulsion of its Arab inhabitants in May 1948, "severely undermined" the morale of surrounding villages, including Al-Ras al-Ahmar, according to  Haganah  Intelligence sources. They  reported that the villagers "had decided to abandon their villages if the Arabs of Safad surrender."

In October 1948 Operation Hiram took place, where the operational orders to the Israeli troop were "to occupy the whole of the Galilee”. On the 30 October 1948, the 71st Battalion from the 7th Armored Brigade took Ras al-Ahmar, together with Rehaniya, Alma and Dayshum. Word of the Jish and Safsaf massacres had apparently spread to Ras al-Ahmar, as the village was largely empty when the 7th Brigade arrived.

By mid-June, 1949, the  village lands of  Al-Ras al-Ahmar  were settled by Jewish immigrants  as part of the policy of Judaisation of Northern Israel.

In 1992  it was noted about "Some houses still remain. One house has a front stairway, and a covered garage that apparently was added by the Israelis who live there. Another house has two high, arched windows. The site also contains stone rubble from destroyed houses, and a few fig trees and cactuses. The nearby settlement cultivates some of the surrounding land and uses the rest for grazing."

References

Bibliography

External links
 Palestine Remembered: Welcome To al-Ras al-Ahmar
 al-Ras al-Ahmar,  Zochrot
Survey of Western Palestine, map 4:  IAA, Wikimedia commons
al-Ras al-Ahmar, from the Khalil Sakakini Cultural Center
al-Ras al-Ahmar, Dr. Khalil Rizk
, Saturday, 27.12.2008, Zochrot

Arab villages depopulated during the 1948 Arab–Israeli War
District of Safad